The Ashland station or Soo Line Depot in Ashland, Wisconsin, United States, was listed on the National Register of Historic Places in 1988.  It is a brownstone building and was used by the Wisconsin Central and later by the Soo Line Railroad.

Passenger train service to the Soo Line Depot ended on January 6, 1959, when trains 117 and 118 were discontinued from Ashland to Spencer.

References

Railway stations on the National Register of Historic Places in Wisconsin
National Register of Historic Places in Ashland County, Wisconsin
Ashland
Richardsonian Romanesque architecture in Wisconsin
Railway stations in the United States opened in 1889
Former railway stations in Wisconsin
Railway stations closed in 1959